Violet Constance Jessop (2 October 1887 – 5 May 1971), often referred to as the "Queen of sinking ships" or "Miss Unsinkable," was an Argentine woman of Irish heritage who worked as an ocean liner stewardess, memoirist, and nurse in the early 20th century.

Early life
Born on 2 October 1887, near Bahía Blanca, Argentina, Violet Constance Jessop was the oldest daughter of Irish immigrants William and Katherine Jessop. She was the first of nine children, six of whom survived. Jessop spent much of her childhood caring for her younger siblings. She became very ill as a child with what is presumed to have been tuberculosis, which she survived despite doctors' predictions that her illness would be fatal. When Jessop was 16 years old, her father died of complications from surgery and her family moved to England, where she attended a convent school and cared for her youngest sister while her mother was at sea working as a stewardess. When her mother became ill, Jessop left school and, following in her mother's footsteps, applied to be a stewardess. Jessop had to dress down to make herself less attractive to be hired. At age 21, her first stewardess position was with Royal Mail Line aboard Orinoco in 1908.

RMS Olympic
In 1911, Jessop began working as a stewardess for the White Star liner . Olympic was a luxury ship that was the largest civilian liner at that time. Jessop was on board on 20 September 1911, when Olympic left from Southampton and collided with the British warship . There were no fatalities and, despite damage, the ship was able to make it back to port without sinking. Jessop chose not to discuss this collision in her memoirs. She continued to work on Olympic until April 1912, when she was transferred to sister ship Titanic.

RMS Titanic
Jessop boarded  as a stewardess on 10 April 1912, at age 24. Four days later, on 14 April, it struck an iceberg in the North Atlantic and sank about two hours and forty minutes after the collision. Jessop described in her memoirs how she was ordered up on deck to serve as an example of how to behave for the non-English speakers who could not follow the instructions given to them. She watched as the crew loaded the lifeboats. She was later ordered into lifeboat 16, and as the boat was being lowered, one of Titanics officers gave her a baby to look after. According to Jessop, while on board Carpathia, a woman, presumably the baby's mother, grabbed the baby she was holding and ran off crying, without saying a word. After arriving in New York City, she later returned to Southampton.

HMHS Britannic
In the First World War, Jessop was a stewardess for the British Red Cross. On the morning of 21 November 1916, she was aboard , the younger sister ship of Olympic and Titanic that had been converted into a hospital ship, when it sank in the Aegean Sea after an unexplained explosion. Britannic sank within 55 minutes, killing 32 of the 1,066 people on board. British authorities hypothesized that the ship had either been struck by a torpedo or had hit a mine planted by German forces. Conspiracy theories have even circulated that suggest the British were responsible for sinking their own ship. In a major diving expedition on the wreck in 2016, however, it was determined that the ship had struck a deep sea mine. This was shown in the documentary film of that dive, The Mystery of the Britannic.

While Britannic was sinking, Jessop and other passengers were nearly killed by the ship's propellers that were shredding lifeboats that collided with the propellers. Jessop had to jump out of her lifeboat, resulting in a traumatic head injury which she survived. In her memoirs, she described the scene she witnessed as Britannic went under: "The white pride of the ocean's medical world ... dipped her head a little, then a little lower and still lower. All the deck machinery fell into the sea like a child's toys. Then she took a fearful plunge, her stern rearing hundreds of feet into the air until with a final roar, she disappeared into the depths." Arthur John Priest and Archie Jewell, two other survivors of the Titanic, were also onboard and both survived.

Later life

Jessop returned to work for White Star Line in 1920, before joining Red Star Line and then Royal Mail Line again. During her tenure with Red Star, Jessop went on two cruises around the World on the company's largest ship, . When Jessop was 36, she married John James Lewis, a fellow White Star Line steward. Lewis had served aboard the Olympic and the RMS Majestic. They divorced around a year later. In 1950, she retired to Great Ashfield, Suffolk. Years after her retirement, Jessop claimed to have received a telephone call, on a stormy night, from a woman who asked Jessop if she had saved a baby on the night that Titanic sank. "Yes," Jessop replied. The voice then said "I was that baby," laughed, and hung up. Her friend and biographer John Maxtone-Graham said it was most likely some children in the village playing a joke on her. She replied, "No, John, I had never told that story to anyone before I told you now." Records indicate that the only baby on lifeboat 16 was Assad Thomas, who was handed to Edwina Troutt, and later reunited with his mother on Carpathia.

Jessop died of congestive heart failure in 1971 at the age of 83.

In popular culture
In the 1958 film A Night To Remember, a scene depicts naval architect Thomas Andrews (played by Michael Goodliffe) instructing a stewardess to be seen wearing her life jacket as an example to the other passengers. Several scenes from this film inspired later depictions of the sinking; in James Cameron's later 1997 blockbuster Titanic, a similar encounter takes place involving Andrews and a stewardess named Lucy, who is also told to wear her life jacket in order to convince the passengers to do the same.

In the 1979 television movie S.O.S. Titanic, she was portrayed as an elderly stewardess played by Madge Ryan.

In the 2000 television movie Britannic, the main character is Vera Campbell (played by Amanda Ryan), a woman who is apprehensive about travelling on Britannic because she had survived the sinking of Titanic four years earlier.

In 2006, "Shadow Divers" John Chatterton and Richie Kohler led an expedition to dive HMHS Britannic. The dive team needed to accomplish a number of tasks including reviewing the expansion joints. The team was looking for evidence that would change the thinking on RMS Titanics sinking. During the expedition, Rosemary E. Lunn played the role of Violet Jessop, re-enacting her jumping into the water, from her lifeboat which was being drawn into Britannics still turning propellers.

The character of Jessop is featured in the Chris Burgess stage play Iceberg – Right Ahead!, staged for the first time Upstairs at the Gatehouse in Highgate, March 2012, to commemorate the centenary of the sinking of Titanic. Jessop's role was played by Amy-Joyce Hastings.

In the 2020 Alma Katsu historical horror novel The Deep, Jessop is a secondary character. The fictional main character meets Jessop while working on the Titanic, who offers her a job and subsequently works with her on the Britannic.

See also
 Wenman Wykeham-Musgrave, a British sailor who survived three consecutive sinkings in the action of 22 September 1914.

References

External links
 
 
 

RMS Titanic's crew and passengers
People from Bahía Blanca
1887 births
1971 deaths
Shipwreck survivors
RMS Titanic survivors
Argentine people of Irish descent
Argentine emigrants to England
English people of Irish descent
British Merchant Service personnel of World War I